Jorhat Assembly constituency is one of the 126 assembly constituencies of Assam Legislative Assembly. Jorhat forms part of the Jorhat Lok Sabha constituency.

Members of Legislative Assembly 
 1952: Debeswar Sarmah, Indian National Congress
 1957: Mahidhar Pegu, Indian National Congress
 1962: Dulal Chandra Barua, Independent
 1967: J. Saikia, Indian National Congress
 1972: Bijoy Krishna Handique, Indian National Congress
 1978: Dulal Chandra Barua, Janata Party
 1983: Dinanath Rajkhowa, Indian National Congress
 1985: Abhijit Sarmah, Independent
 1991: Hitendra Nath Goswami, Asom Gana Parishad
 1996: Hitendra Nath Goswami, Asom Gana Parishad
 2001: Hitendra Nath Goswami, Asom Gana Parishad
 2006: Rana Goswami, Indian National Congress
 2011: Rana Goswami, Indian National Congress
 2016: Hitendra Nath Goswami, Bharatiya Janata Party
 2021: Hitendra Nath Goswami, Bharatiya Janata Party

Election results

2021 result

2016 result

2011

References

External links 
 

Assembly constituencies of Assam
Jorhat